Scott William Howard (born July 11, 1990) is a Canadian curler. As an alternate for his father, Glenn Howard, Scott Howard won the 2012 Tim Hortons Brier and the 2012 World Men's Curling Championship.

Personal life
Howard attended Penetanguishene Secondary School and Georgian College. He currently works as an estimator/contract manager at Maacon Construction. He lives in Tiny, Ontario. He is in a relationship with Kelly Stewart, and as of 2022, he has one son.

Teams

Notes

References

External links

1990 births
Brier champions
Living people
People from Midland, Ontario
People from Penetanguishene
World curling champions
Curlers from Simcoe County
Canadian male curlers
Canada Cup (curling) participants